Zövlə (also, Zovlya and Zavilya) is a village and municipality in the Lankaran Rayon of Azerbaijan.  It has a population of 2,474.

References 

Populated places in Lankaran District